Sheila is a common given name for a female.

Sheila may also refer to:

 Empire Sheila, a ship in the service of the British Government
 Sheila (film), a 1935 Indian Punjabi-language film
 "Sheila" (Jamie T song), a 2006 alternative rock song
 "Sheila" (Tommy Roe song), a 1962 pop song
 "Sheila" (Frank Sinatra song), 1953
 Sheila (dog), a dog who received the Dickin Medal in 1945
 Sheila (model) (born 1973), Japanese model
 Sheila, New Brunswick
Sheila Majid, Malaysian singer
Sheila (French singer), French singer (born Annie Chancel)
Sheila (German singer)

See also
 Sheela (disambiguation)
 Shayla (disambiguation)
 Shelia
 The Sheilas